The Lord Keeper Act 1562 (5 Eliz 1 c 18) was an Act of the Parliament of England. It made the Lord Keeper of the Great Seal "entitled to like place, pre-eminence, jurisdiction, execution of laws, and all other customs, commodities, and advantages as the Lord Chancellor."

The whole Act was repealed by the Statute Law (Repeals) Act 1969.

References
Halsbury's Statutes

Acts of the Parliament of England (1485–1603)
1562 in England
1562 in law